Mathias From Frederikshavn (born 16 December 1997) is a Danish professional ice hockey forward currently playing for Västerås IK in the HockeyAllsvenskan (Allsv). From was selected by the Chicago Blackhawks in the fifth round, 143rd overall, in the 2016 NHL Entry Draft.

Playing career
From originally played as a youth in his native Denmark with Frederikshavn IK of the Danish Division 1 before joining Swedish club, Rögle BK, to continue his development as a junior.

He played three seasons in the Swedish Hockey League for Rögle BK before leaving the club and playing in the Swedish second tier league, the HockeyAllsvenskan with AIK IF and Modo Hockey.

On 9 April 2020, From opted to continue his European career by leaving Sweden and agreeing to a one-year contract with German club, Düsseldorfer EG of the DEL.

Following the conclusion of his contract in Germany, From opted to return to the Swedish Allsvenskan, agreeing to a two-year contract with Västerås IK on 1 June 2021.

Career statistics

Regular season and playoffs

International

References

External links
 

1997 births
Living people
AIK IF players
Chicago Blackhawks draft picks
Danish ice hockey forwards
Düsseldorfer EG players
People from Frederikshavn
Modo Hockey players
Rögle BK players
Södertälje SK players
Sportspeople from the North Jutland Region